Events of 2019 in Chile.

Incumbents 
 President: Sebastián Piñera (RN)

Events 

 January 19 – A magnitude 6.7 earthquake hits Tongoy, Coquimbo Region in Chile, causing two deaths and as many as 200,000 people left without power. Despite its moderate magnitude, since it was an intraplate earthquake, it caused some serious damage in La Serena and nearby cities.
 October 21 – Eye injury in the 2019–2020 Chilean protests: a record of twenty patients with eye injury arrive at Hospital del Salvador, of these ten arrive in a single hour.

Births

Deaths 
8 August – Manfred Max-Neef

See also
 	

 		
 2019 Pan American Games
 2019 Chilean protests

References

 
2010s in Chile
Years of the 21st century in Chile
Chile
Chile